Isamu Shiraishi (born 18 December 1920) was a Japanese weightlifter. He competed in the men's bantamweight event at the 1952 Summer Olympics.

References

External links
 

1920 births
Possibly living people
Japanese male weightlifters
Olympic weightlifters of Japan
Weightlifters at the 1952 Summer Olympics
Place of birth missing